Mosaik is a German comic book magazine. First published in December 1955, it is the longest-running German (and European) monthly comic book and the only one originating in East Germany that still exists. Mosaik also appeared in other countries and other languages. In its English-language edition it was published under the title Mosaic.

Mosaik was created by illustrator and caricaturist Hannes Hegen. From 1955 to 1975, the protagonists of Mosaik were Dig, Dag and Digedag, known together as the Digedags. They were replaced in 1976 by Abrax, Brabax and Califax, known together as the Abrafaxe, who are still the main characters today.

More than 200 million issues have been sold from 1955 until today. At the height of its popularity, prior to German reunification, Mosaik had a print run of almost a million copies per month. After reunification, the print run has varied from more than 100,000 in the early 1990s to about 80,000 in 2007.

Digedags years
The East German publisher Verlag Neues Leben, in East Berlin, had wanted to counter Western comics and magazines with a magazine of their own when Hannes Hegen approached them with his ideas for Mosaik and the Digedags. Reaching an agreement with Neues Leben, Hegen created the first issue of Mosaik for publishing in December 1955. Mosaik was published quarterly until July 1957, when it switched to a monthly schedule that has continued uninterrupted to this day. To support the schedule, the publisher hired additional artists, colorists and writers to support Hegen – a team which became known as the Mosaik-Kollektiv (Mosaik Collective). Only Hegen was credited on the cover, however.

Abrafaxe years
In 1975, Hegen left the publisher over a disagreement and took the rights to the Digedags characters with him. The Mosaik-Kollektiv, not wanting to end publication of Mosaik, together created new characters to replace the Digedags. The final versions of the Abrafaxe were created by writer Lothar Dräger and artist Lona Rietschel. During the half-year period of creating the new characters and stories, reprints of old Digedags stories were run in Mosaik, until the new characters premiered in January 1976.

English-language editions 
The English editions of Mosaik have mostly appeared mostly under the name Mosaic. Of Hannes Hegen's Mosaik, issue 105, Die Seeräuberburg, was issued in a limited run in 1965 in English as The Pirates Castle. According to a former staff member at the publishing house, this was intended as a promotional issue for the United States market. An agreement had been reached to publish the comic books in the US; however, because of the US policy of economic embargo policy against Eastern European states in the Cold War, the contract could not be fulfilled.

Ten anthology volumes of Hegen's Mosaik were published in English for the international market under the name Mosaic Comic Books:

 The Digedags in America
 The Digedags on the Mississippi
 The Digedags and the Indians
 The Digedags in the Rocky Mountains
 The Digedags in New Orleans
 The Digedags on the Missouri
 The Digedags and the Golden Treasure
 The Digedags in Panama
 The Digedags and the Pirate Island
 The Digedags in New York

In the mid-1980s, 42 Mosaic books were published in English in the GDR for India. There is also a promotional flyer for these issues, which states that the Mosaic with the Abrafaxe is published in English and Arabic in addition to German, advertises for subscriptions, and includes an order form.

Other known foreign-language publications 
Reissues of Mosaik magazines and books have appeared in many different countries, almost always in the respective national language.

Albania
 Mozaik comic magazine (1971)
Belgium and Netherlands (Mosaik in Dutch language)
 Mosaic book – Dig en Dag op Stap (1972 – 1978?)
 Mosaic anthology – Dig en Dag op Stap (1978)
 Mosaic-Books
 Een Stripboek – Dikkerdaks In America
 Een Stripboek – Dikkerdaks Aan Mississippi
China
 Mosaik books (2000–present)
 Mosaik Albums
 Mosaik Onepager
Croatia
 Mozaik books 1– (2004–present, bimonthly)
Czechoslovakia
 Newspaper Reprints Comic magazine of the Czechoslovak Communist Youth Organization Pionýr with Rytíř Runkl – Ritter Runkel (1968)
Czech Republic
 Albums (2003–present)
 Congo – Abrafaxové v Africe
 Small detectives
 Onepager
 Mateřídouška (Onepager – from # 9 / 2005)
Finland
 Mosaiikki – Mosaik comic magazine (1962–1967)
 Mosaic-Books Mosaiikki (1980–7 Books)
France
 Hollywood Pursuit 2 (1998)
Greece
 Mosaic books and Mosaik comic magazine (2001–present)
Hungary
 Mozaik comic magazine 1971 – 1976 Digedags, 1976–1990 and 2001–present Abrafaxe
 Mosaic-Books:
 Digedagék Amerikában (1987)
 Detektív Palánták: Forró nyomon a három manó (2001)
 Na még egyszer Robin! (2002)
 Kongó (2003)
 Vitorlát fel, Robin! (2006)
 Mozaik books of Abrafaxe and Digedags (2006–present): reprints of previously published books in anthologies
India
 Mosaic – 1–42 in English (1986)
Indonesia
 Abrafaxe issues
 Mosaik Abrafaxe – 1–6 (2001–2002)
 Albums – Among black flag (2002) – The Abrafaxe – Harta karun
Korea
 Mosaic books – 1 – (2003–present)
Lebanon
 Mosaik – released in Arabic (1984)
Romania
 Mozaic comic magazine 1–3 (2005–2006)
Russia
 Mosaika – comic magazine No. 1–14 (1993–1994) in Russian
 New Life (Journal of the German-speaking population of Russia) – The journey of Abrafaxe to Goslar (in German)
Slovenia
 Onepager (2003–present)
 Hepko (Slovene edition)
 Happy (English edition)
Spain
 Various Mosaik albums in Spanish and Catalan (2004–present)
Turkey
 Abrafaxe issues
 Bacaxizlar 1 – (2001/ # 1–8)
Yugoslavia
 Mozaik – in *Serbo-Croatian (1971)
Vietnam
 Mosaik comic magazine - 1-8 (2005–present)

References

Sources
 Matthias Friske. Die Geschichte des MOSAIK von Hannes Hegen: eine Comic-Legende in der DDR. Berlin: Lukas, 2008. . 
 Mark Lehmstedt: Die geheime Geschichte der Digedags. Die Publikations- und Zensurgeschichte des Mosaik von Hannes Hegen, Leipzig 2010, Lehmstedt Verlag, .

http://history-fiction.ru/books/all_1/user_10_4/

External links
 Official Abrafaxe Homepage
 Official Digedags Homepage 
  Etc

1955 comics debuts
1955 establishments in East Germany
Adventure comics
Comics magazines published in Germany
German comic strips
Humor comics
Magazines established in 1955
Monthly magazines published in Germany
German-language magazines
Quarterly magazines published in Germany